Joseph Somes (1819 – 29 May 1871) was a British Conservative Party politician.

He was elected MP for Kingston upon Hull at a by-election in 1859 but lost the seat at the next election in 1865.

References

External links
 

Conservative Party (UK) MPs for English constituencies
UK MPs 1859–1865
1819 births
1871 deaths